Plectroctena mandibularis is a large species of ant that ranges from the Eastern Cape, South Africa, through East Africa to Ethiopia. Their workers forage singly in open terrain, and their colony size seldom exceeds 50 individuals. It is one of the large Plectroctena species, including P. conjugata and P. minor, that specialize on adult millipedes as prey. The nest is composed of chambers that are typically located 2 feet or more below the surface, and the nest entrances are usually marked by large piles of earth.

References

External links
Species: Plectroctena mandibularis, Antweb
Plectroctena mandibularis, Antwiki

Ponerinae
Insects described in 1858
Hymenoptera of Africa